The Cricket  (Italian: La Cicala) is a 1980 Italian erotic drama film directed by Alberto Lattuada. For this film Virna Lisi was awarded David di Donatello for best actress, while Fred Bongusto won the Nastro d'Argento for best score.

Plot summary

Clio plays a fun-loving girl who likes men. She leaves her home town and meets up with Wilma, a once-famous singer. After Wilma bombs out at a local joint they hook up together and become prostitutes.

Enter Tony who falls for Wilma and opens a gas/food/lodging establishment after they marry. Tony slowly gets fed up with Wilma, especially after her beautiful daughter arrives. An erotic yet tragic film.

Cast

 Virna Lisi: Wilma Malinverni
 Anthony Franciosa: Annibale Mereghetti aka Ulisses
 Renato Salvatori: Carburo
 Clio Goldsmith: Cicala
 Barbara De Rossi: Saveria
 Aristide Caporale: Bretella
 Riccardo Garrone: Ermete

References

External links 
 

1980 films
1980s erotic drama films
1980s Italian-language films
Films directed by Alberto Lattuada
Italian erotic drama films
1980 drama films
1980s Italian films